Mats Kirkebirkeland (born 8 May 1989) is a Norwegian politician for the Conservative Party.

He served as a deputy representative to the Parliament of Norway from Oslo during the term 2017–2021. In total he met during 175 days of parliamentary session. He hails from Bergen.

References

1989 births
Living people
People from Fusa
Politicians from Oslo
Deputy members of the Storting
Conservative Party (Norway) politicians
Politicians from Bergen
21st-century Norwegian politicians